is a passenger railway station in located in the city of Kumano, Mie Prefecture, Japan, operated by Central Japan Railway Company (JR Tōkai).

Lines

Station layout
The station consists of a single-sided platform, adjacent to the main station building and serving track 1, and a two-sided island platform, reached by a pedestrian footbridge and serving tracks 2 and 3. The station has a Midori no Madoguchi staffed ticket office.

Platforms

History
The JGR became the Japanese National Railways (JNR) after World War II, and the line was renamed the Kisei Main Line on 15 July 1959, at which time the station was renamed Kumanoshi. The station was absorbed into the JR Central network upon the privatization of the JNR on 1 April 1987. A new station building was completed in March 1990.

Passenger statistics
In fiscal 2019, the station was used by an average of 465 passengers daily (boarding passengers only).

Surrounding area
Kumano City Hall
Kumano City Ido Elementary School
Kumano City Kimoto Elementary School

See also
List of railway stations in Japan

References

External links

 JR Central timetable 
 Kumanoshi Station information (JR Central) 

Railway stations in Japan opened in 1940
Railway stations in Mie Prefecture
Kumano, Mie